James Gibson Hope (11 September 1919 – 20 January 1979) was a Scottish footballer, who played as a winger in the Football League for Manchester City.

References

1919 births
1979 deaths
Footballers from Glasgow
Association football wingers
Scottish footballers
Manchester City F.C. players
Queen of the South F.C. players
Arbroath F.C. players
Elgin City F.C. players
Scottish Football League players
English Football League players